McMafia is a British crime drama television series created by Hossein Amini and James Watkins, and directed by Watkins. It is inspired by the book McMafia: A Journey Through the Global Criminal Underworld by journalist Misha Glenny (2008). The series stars James Norton as Alex Godman, the British-raised son of a Russian mafia boss living in London whose father is trying to escape from the world of organised crime. It is co-produced by BBC, AMC Networks, and Cuba Pictures. It premiered in the United Kingdom on BBC One on 1 January 2018, and in the United States on AMC on 26 February 2018.

Cast

Main cast 

 James Norton as Alex Godman
 David Strathairn as Semiyon Kleiman, Russian-Israeli businessman
 Juliet Rylance as Rebecca Harper, Alex's fiancée
 Merab Ninidze as Vadim Kalyagin, powerful member of the Russian mafia
 Aleksey Serebryakov as Dimitri Godman, Alex's father
 Maria Shukshina as Oksana Godman, Alex's mother
 Angel Woodland as Katya Godman, Alex's sister
 David Dencik as Boris Godman, Alex's uncle
 Oshri Cohen as Joseph, Israeli bodyguard
 Sofia Lebedeva as Lyudmilla Nikolayeva, beauty therapist
 Caio Blat as Antonio Mendez
 Kirill Pirogov as Ilya Fedorov
 Nawazuddin Siddiqui as Dilly Mahmood, Indian business partner
 Karel Roden as Karel Benes

Recurring cast 
 Yuval Scharf as Tanya
 Anna Levanova as Natasha
 Clifford Samuel as Femi
 Maria Mashkova as Masha
 Kemi-Bo Jacobs as Karin
 Atul Kale as Benny Chopra
 Evgeni Golan as Marat
 Eve Parmiter as Jennifer
 Tim Ahern as Sydney Bloom
 Ellie Piercy as Sandrine
 Danila Kozlovsky as Grigory Mishin
 Alexander Dyachenko as Oleg
 Fernando Cayo as Guillermo Alegre
 Lidiya Fedoseyeva-Shukshina as Vadim Kalyagin's mother

Production 
McMafia was inspired by journalist Misha Glenny's non-fiction book McMafia: A Journey Through the Global Criminal Underworld, published in 2008. The series took a few stories from Glenny's book, which documents various mafia organisations thriving around the world today. The series was created by Hossein Amini and James Watkins, and is a co-production of the BBC, AMC, and Cuba Pictures, in association with Twickenham Studios.

The BBC announced the series in October 2015. In April 2016, it was announced that James Norton had been cast in the lead role of Alex Godman and that co-creator Watkins would direct all eight episodes. Additional casting, including Maria Shukshina and Aleksey Serebryakov as Alex's parents, and David Strathairn as a shady Israeli businessman, was announced in November 2016. In addition to Amini and Watkins, David Farr, Peter Harness, and Laurence Coriat co-wrote the series.

Filming locations included London, Zagreb, Split, Opatija, Primošten, Qatar, Mumbai, Prague, Cairo, Belgrade, Belize, Istanbul, Moscow and Tel Aviv. The budget was several million pounds per episode.

Episodes

Reception 
Lucy Mangan, writing for The Guardian said that the show was "beautifully put together" and described the script as "a cut above average".

Planned second series
In 2018, BBC One announced that it had recommissioned the programme for an eight-part second series.

In March 2022, it was reported that the planned second series had been cancelled, but author and executive producer Misha Glenny immediately denied the report on Twitter.

References

External links 
 
 

2010s British crime drama television series
2018 British television series debuts
2018 British television series endings
2010s British television miniseries
AMC (TV channel) original programming
BBC television dramas
English-language television shows
Television series about organized crime
Television shows set in Colombia
Television shows set in Croatia
Television shows set in England
Television shows set in Israel
Television shows set in Russia
Television shows set in the Czech Republic
International Emmy Award for Best Drama Series winners
Works about the Russian Mafia
Television shows filmed in Belgrade
Television shows filmed in Croatia